In Ohio, State Route 22 may refer to:
U.S. Route 22 in Ohio, the only Ohio highway numbered 22 since 1927
Ohio State Route 22 (1923-1927), now US 23 (Marion to Carey), SR 15 (Carey to Ney), and SR 249 (Ney to Indiana)

22